The Hamtoren is the remains of Den Ham castle in Vleuten in Utrecht. The tower is located north of the Utrecht - Rotterdam railway line on an old road to Harmelen.

History
The castle mentioned for the first time in a charter from 1325 was initially built as a residential tower. It is believed that it was built around 1260, at an inlet of the old Rhine because it made it more defensible. The tower allowed the owner to exert power over the surrounding area.

Den Ham was repeatedly deployed. In 1481 it was partially destroyed, then it was expanded to include a second tower. In 1536 the States of Utrecht recognized it as a city of knights, the residents were then admitted to the Knighthood. In 1642 the gatehouse that gives access to Den Ham was rebuilt. By marriage in 1711 the castle came into the possession of the Hacfort family where it would remain until 1811. Around 1872 the castle was in disrepair and, apart from the tower, it was demolished. About 100 years later, the tower was restored. Today, the tower is privately owned and can only be visited very rarely. In 2016 the tower was purchased by Bas Kennis, musician with Blof, with the idea to transform it into a studio.

The excavated tower has one and a half meter thick brick walls of about 27 meters high. Among other things, a turn has been made on top and the total height is approximately 35 meters. Inside it has six floors and a basement where medieval beams have been preserved.

See also
Huis te Vleuten

References

Sources
 Den Ham op Kastelen in Utrecht
 J. H. Huiting en J. Kamphuis, Den Ham, in: B. Olde Meierink, G. van Baaren en R.G. Bosch van Drakestein et al. (red.) (1995), Kastelen en ridderhofsteden in Utrecht, Matrijs, Utrecht, pp. 225-230, 
 S. Krul et al. (red.) (2004), Achter Utrechtse gevels, aflevering 1, Waanders, Zwolle, pp. 10-15,

External links

Castles in Utrecht (province)
Towers in Utrecht (province)
Towers completed in the 13th century
Buildings and structures in Utrecht (city)